Dorcadion paulae is a species of beetle in the family Cerambycidae. It was described by Corraleño Iñarra and Murría Beltrán in 2012.

See also 
Dorcadion

References

paulae
Beetles described in 2012